Dulabhai Zindabad is a Bangladeshi dramatic action film directed by Montazur Rahman Akbar. The film was written by Abdullah Zahir Babu and screenplay was by Montazur Rahman Akbar. The film stars Moushumi, Mim, Bappy and Dipjol in the lead roles. with Aruna Biswas, Amit Hasan, Ahmed Sharif as supporting cast. The film was produced by Md Nadir Khan under the banner of Rajesh Films. The film was released on 20 October 2017 in Bangladesh.

Plot 
Joshna(Moushumi) is a hard working NGO employee who leads a struggling life with her autistic brother and two sisters. Her husband sultan (Dipjol) fights against injustice and crime in their village but when his sister in law (Mim) falls in love with the son of the unethical Chairman of the village, Sultan is left in a life and death dilemma.

Cast
 Moushumi as Josna
 Dipjol as Sultan aka Dulabhai, Josna's husband
 Mim as Jamuna, Joshna's sister
 Bappy as Sagor
 Aruna Biswas 
 Amit Hasan 
 Ahmed Sharif 
 Bobby 
 Jacky Alamgir
 Elias Kobra
 Shabnam Parvin
 Ziasmin 
 Saif Khan

Music

Filming
Shooting started on 16 February 2017 at BFDC. After completing some scenes at Dipjol's house, the film was finished on 13 July 2017. The film got release clearance on 29 August 2017, and the trailer was released on 27 September 2017 via YouTube.

Release 
The film was released on 128 screens on 20 October 2017.

References

External links
 

Bengali-language Bangladeshi films
2017 films
Bangladeshi drama films
Films scored by Emon Saha
Films scored by Imran Mahmudul
2010s Bengali-language films
Films directed by Montazur Rahman Akbar
2017 drama films